Grojband is a Canadian animated television series created by Todd Kauffman and Mark Thornton for Teletoon in Canada and Cartoon Network in the United States. Produced by Fresh TV and Neptoon Studios, with animation by Elliott Animation, in association with FremantleMedia Enterprises, it premiered on June 10, 2013 in the United States, on September 5, 2013 in Canada, and on April 21, 2014 in the United Kingdom. It is executive produced by Tom McGillis and Jennifer Pertsch, the creators of the hit animated reality franchise Total Drama.

Synopsis
Grojband follows the story of a Canadian indie rock garage band of the same name formed by Corey Riffin and his three best friends, Laney and twin brothers Kin and Kon, as they work together to propel their band to international stardom. When they do not have the lyrics, Corey and his friends get Trina, Corey's sister, into an emotional mode to write entries in her diary that Corey can use for lyrical inspiration, so that Corey and his friends can perform a perfect song.

Characters

Grojband
 Corey Jaron Riffin (voiced by Lyon Smith) – Corey is the younger brother of Trina Riffin. He is a 13-year-old confident, optimistic, laidback, and quirky leader, vocalist, and guitarist of Grojband. Although good-natured, he is on a constant search for new gigs for the band to perform at and will do whatever it takes to play music at them, which is usually by angering his sister, Trina, who will write in her diary. He then translates her venting into lyrics for their songs due to the fact he is unable to come up with lyrics of his own. He is named after the Canadian musician Corey Crewe.
 Laney Penn (voiced by Bryn McAuley) – Laney is the bassist, Vocalist and self-proclaimed band manager of Grojband. She is the younger sister of Chloe. Laney is a short, sarcastic, ambitious, and passionate redhead and the only female in the band, the latter of which everyone else isn't able to acknowledge. She tends to be the most rational member of the band, mainly because she cares about the others, but is usually prone to giving in to Corey and his schemes. This is because she has a crush on Corey, to which Corey is oblivious to. Her name is a pun on the famous Beatles song Penny Lane.
 Kin Kujira (voiced by Sergio Di Zio) – Kin is the Japanese keyboardist of the band, and Kon's small, bespectacled older twin brother and best friend. Despite his eccentric behaviour and antics, he is extremely smart and has a knack for advanced technology, often building strange gadgets that help the band with their gigs.
 Kon Kujira (voiced by Tim Beresford) – Kon is the Japanese drummer of the band, and Kin's large, overweight younger twin brother and best friend. Kon is sometimes dense and just as crazy as his brother Kin, but is very strong, usually well-meaning, and has a cherubic and excitable demeanor. He and his brother derive their first names from King Kong and their last name from Gojira, the Japanese name for Godzilla.

The Newmans
The Newmans are a gender-reversed doppelgänger band to Grojband. They are Grojband's rivals and always compete with them for different gigs or in contests. They are named after the character Newman from Seinfeld. Their voice actors are the same as the original Grojband.
 Carrie Beff – Corey's doppelgänger: a stuck-up, shallow girl who is the leader, guitarist, and vocalist of The Newmans. She is also Mina's younger sister. As seen throughout the show, Corey and Carrie are bitter enemies, as one would love to see the other go down. However, both have shown a slight tolerance for each other, and will work together if the situation calls for it.
 Larry (Lenny) Nepp – Laney's gender-bent rival: bassist and band manager of The Newmans. Similar to Laney, Larry has a visible crush on Carrie, Corey's gender-warped rival, as seen in one episode. He isn't as courageous as her, though.
 Kim Kagami – Kin's gender-bent rival, who is also the keyboardist of The Newmans. When Grojband and the Newmans fused together in one episode, Kin fused with Kim and both showed some jealousy against their respective twin for being such great friends with each other.
 Konnie Kagami – Kon's gender-bent rival, who is also the drummer of The Newmans. In one episode, it is shown that under certain circumstances, Kon and Konnie are able to get along.

Others
 Katrina “Trina” Riffin (voiced by Alyson Court) – Trina is Corey's 16-year-old sister. She is mean, cruel, self-centered, and always determined to make Corey's life miserable. She is the series' main antagonist and constantly tries to ruin Grojband's gigs. Whenever she is overcome with emotion (usually anger, sometimes love/happiness, fear, or sadness), she impulsively writes her diary in a dramatic manner, which provides Grojband with the lyrical inspiration they need for their songs. She has a crush on the cute neighborhood boy, Nick Mallory. Her full first name is Katrina, and she was kind with others at one point in her life. She is named after the late Canadian musician Trina Crewe.
 Bernadette "Mina" Beff (voiced by Denise Oliver) – Mina is a timid, naive, and bespectacled 16-year-old girl who thinks is Trina's best friend, but in reality, she is more like her slave. Although much nicer than Trina, she wishes to be as cool as Trina, and does whatever she tells her to do. Her real name is Bernadette, but Trina forced her to legally change it so their names would rhyme. She is also Carrie's older sister. Her last name is a pun on the phrase "BFF", or "Best Friends Forever".
 Nick Mallory (voiced by Graeme Cornies) – Nick is an extremely cool and handsome 16-year-old boy, whom all the girls in school adore, especially Trina. He is sometimes referred to as "Hunky Nick Mallory" by Trina and many others around him. He always refers to himself in the third person, but isn't inherently antagonistic, and will sometimes aid the band when they see use of him. He is named after Nick Moore and Mallory Keaton, two characters from the sitcom Family Ties.
 Kate Persky and Allie Day (voiced by Addison Holley and Madelyn May respectively) – Allie and Kate are Grojband's 9-year-old groupies and their biggest (and possibly, only) fans. They are head over heels in love with Corey, and are willing to do anything for him, but they can be creepy and obsessive at times. They are named after the title characters of the sitcom Kate & Allie, while their last names come from Bill Persky and Linda Day, the directors of the aforementioned series.
 Mayor Mellow (voiced by Kedar Brown) – The diminutive mayor of Peaceville, who is always seen carrying a picture of his mother around, and speaks in rhymes. He is well-intentioned and wants what is best for his town, but his ways to do it are questionable and often extreme. He also has a somewhat short fuse, and he jumps to the conclusion too soon at times.
 Buzz Newsworthy and Chance Happening (voiced by Dwayne Hill and Julie Lemieux respectively) – The news anchors of the Peaceville News. They are quick on the scene to cover important news events. However they have a habit of exaggerating the stories. They also sometimes have feuds over who is more proficient.

Recurring
 Barney (voiced by Rob Tinkler) – A very rich billionaire who owns multiple businesses around Peaceville. He is always addressed by the name of the business in front of his real name: such as while he works at the salad restaurant he is referred to as "Salad Barney", or at the coffee house he is referred to as "Bean Barney".
 Party Danimal (voiced by Christian Potenza) – The school party critic who first appeared in the episode "Pox N' Roll", he rates other people's parties with a score out of "10 Awesomes". 
 Captain Tighty Whitey (voiced by Rob Tinkler) – A pirate captain who enjoys stealing things from people and finding treasure. He first appeared in the episode "On the Air and Out to Sea".
 G'ORB (voiced by Rob Tinkler) – An evil alien space orb who is bent on destroying the world. He is the leader of a band called The Orb Experience, made up of three other space orbs named T'ORB, Z'ORB, and N'ORB. He first appeared in the episode "Space Jammin'" where he challenged Grojband to a battle of the bands and lost. He was only a minor one-time character with the rest of the band until he returned in the season 1 finale episode "Hear Us Rock Part 2", where he returned and challenged Grojband to a rematch and threatened to destroy the world with an apocalyptic meteor if they lost. G'ORB cheated in the battle of the bands to make him win but at the end of the episode, T'ORB had become fed up with putting up with all of his plans, he stood up to him, overthrew him and let Grojband win. After this, T'ORB broke up the band, forced G'ORB to apologize, and made him give up evil and become good.
Chloe Penn (character has no spoken dialogue) - A tall redhead girl who mainly appears in the show as a background character. Chloe is shown to have a romantic interest towards Nick Mallory, as well as Party Danimal in one occasion. Co-creator Todd Kauffman confirmed her to be Laney's older sister, albeit unofficially.

Episodes

Production
Series co-creator Todd Kauffman has stated that he had always wanted to make a series about a garage band, and believed the concept of having the band's songs come out of the diary of the lead character's sister would make the premise more interesting. Using this idea, he was able to successfully pitch the series to Fresh TV and its president Tom McGillis. Soon afterwards, Teletoon, FremantleMedia, and Cartoon Network all took interest in the project and came in to help with its production and distribution.

The series is animated in Adobe Flash, with series co-creator Mark Thornton stating that using the software removes the need to outsource the show's animation to countries outside of Canada as is commonly done with American animated series. In producing the series, the creators sought to homage and take inspiration from a wide variety of movies and television series, particularly the works of American animators like Craig McCracken, Maxwell Atoms, and Genndy Tartakovsky, as well as Ferris Bueller's Day Off and the works of Phil Lord and Christopher Miller. They also sought to explore many genres and styles of music with the series, including country music, heavy metal, yodeling, sea shanties, and even elevator music.

Many concepts were changed as the series developed. Notably, Grojband was originally pitched as a 22 minute series with its intro and theme song being 60 seconds long, but in the final product, episodes are instead 11 minutes long and the show's intro and theme song are 20 seconds long. These changes resulted in the removal of several plot elements ignored or unexplained in the final product, including the presence of the characters' parents and Corey and his band having to return Trina's diary back to her without being noticed at the end of every episode. Another notable change between the original pitch and the final product is that Corey and Trina's shared last name is "Trippin" instead of "Riffin".

Broadcast
In the United States, the series was aired on Cartoon Network and Boomerang from June 10, 2013 to July 12, 2015. In Canada, it debuted on September 5, 2013 on Teletoon and Télétoon. Grojband debuted on February 10, 2014 on ABC3 in Australia and in April 2014 on Pop in the United Kingdom. The show started airing on April 8, 2014 on Cartoon Network in Africa.

Home media
On December 10, 2013, an official website for the series was launched.

Singles from various episodes were released on the iTunes store.

In Australia, the entire series was released on DVD on June 4, 2014 by Shock Entertainment. Two volumes were released: Rock On (containing episodes 1-13) and Hear Us Rock! (containing episodes 14-26).

In December 2015, all 26 episodes of Grojband were added to Netflix in the US. Two years later, the show was removed.

References

External links

2010s Canadian animated television series
2013 Canadian television series debuts
2015 Canadian television series endings
Animated musical groups
Animated television series about brothers
Animated television series about twins
Boomerang (TV network) original programming
Canadian children's animated comedy television series
Canadian children's animated musical television series
Canadian flash animated television series
Cartoon Network original programming
English-language television shows
Teen animated television series
Teletoon original programming
Television series by FremantleMedia Kids & Family
Television series by Fresh TV
Television shows filmed in Toronto
Television franchises introduced in 2013